San Fidel is a census-designated place  in Cibola County, New Mexico, United States. Its population was 138 as of the 2010 census. San Fidel has a post office with ZIP code 87049, which opened on December 24, 1910. New Mexico State Road 124, the original Route 66, also known as the "Old Road," passes through the community.

The Acoma Curio Shop, which is listed on the National Register of Historic Places, is located in San Fidel.

Demographics

References

External links

Census-designated places in New Mexico
Census-designated places in Cibola County, New Mexico